Samuel B. Dresser (November 23, 1831 - November 20, 1901 was an American businessman, farmer and politician.

Background 
Born in Bangor, Maine, received a public school education, and became a farmer. He moved to Taylors Falls, Minnesota Territory in 1851 and was in the lumber and merchant business. Dresser moved to a farm in a part of the township of Osceola, in Polk County, Wisconsin called Osceola Prairie, in 1862.

Public office 
Dresser was elected as a Republican to the Wisconsin State Assembly seat representing Ashland, Barron, Bayfield, Burnett, Douglas and Polk Counties for the 1870 session, with 620 votes against 305 for Democrat V. M. Babcock, replacing fellow Republican Henry D. Barron, who had just been appointed auditor of the United States Treasury. He was assigned to the standing committees on lumber and manufactures, and on legislative expenditures, chairing the latter. He was not a candidate for re-election in 1870, and was succeeded by another Republican, Samuel S. Vaughn. Dresser was sheriff of Polk County in 1877 and 1878. By the time of his death, he had also served in various town government offices in Osceola for a quarter of a century.

Death and heritage 
In 1871, he was appointed Deputy Lumber Agent for the St. Croix - Lake Superior railroad grant lands. He would spend some time acting to protect the timberlands of this district.

Dresser died in the town of Osceola November 20, 1901. Dresser had donated land for a railroad; when the area became a community, it was first called Dresser Junction and later simply Dresser, Wisconsin.

Notes

1831 births
1901 deaths
Politicians from Bangor, Maine
People from Chisago County, Minnesota
People from Osceola, Wisconsin
American city founders
Businesspeople from Minnesota
Businesspeople from Wisconsin
Wisconsin sheriffs
19th-century American politicians
19th-century American businesspeople
19th-century American farmers
Republican Party members of the Wisconsin State Assembly